The first census of the Madras Presidency was taken in the year 1822. It returned a population of 13,476,923. The second census conducted in 1836-37 returned a population of  13,967,395, an increase of only 490,472 in 15 years. The first quinquennial enumeration of the population was made in 1851-52. It returned a population of 22,031,697. Subsequent enumerations were made in 1856-57, 1861–62 and 1866-67. The population of Madras Presidency was found to be 22,857,855 in 1851-52, 24,656,509 in 1861-62 and 26,539,052 in 1866-67.

The first organized census of India was conducted in 1871. It returned a population of 31,220,973 for Madras Presidency. Since then, a census has been conducted once every ten years. The last census of British India held in 1941 returned a population of 49,341,810 for Madras Presidency.

Cities

Notes 

Madras Presidency

Tamil society

Demographic history of India
Social history of Tamil Nadu
Social history of Karnataka